Kimiko Date was the defending champion but she had retired at the end of the previous year.

Martina Hingis won in the final 7–6, 6–4 against Monica Seles.

Seeds
A champion seed is indicated in bold text while text in italics indicates the round in which that seed was eliminated. The top four seeds received a bye to the second round.

  Martina Hingis (champion)
  Monica Seles (final)
  Amanda Coetzer (semifinals)
  Arantxa Sánchez Vicario (second round)
  Anke Huber (second round)
  Mary Pierce (semifinals)
  Conchita Martínez (quarterfinals)
  Irina Spîrlea (second round)

Draw

Final

Section 1

Section 2

External links
 1997 Toshiba Classic draw

Southern California Open
1997 WTA Tour